Richard Elias Cansino (born August 10, 1953) is an American voice actor. He is also known as Richard Hayworth because he is the nephew of Rita Hayworth. Richard is best known for his voice work as Kenshin Himura in the anime adaptation of Rurouni Kenshin.

Additionally, Richard is also known for his performances as Izumo Kamizuki from the Naruto series and Legato Bluesummers from Trigun.

Filmography

Television
 Hannah Montana - Pierre (Ep. Wish You Wish You Were a Star)
 Ned's Declassified School Survival Guide - Mr. Phorchin (Ep. Hallways & Friends Moving)
 Scrubs - Dr. Rose (Ep. My Nightingale)
 Star Trek: The Next Generation - Deja Q - Dr. Garin
 Phantom Investigators - Felix Navarro (voice)

Anime
 8 Man After - Ichiro
 Argento Soma - Mr. X
 Bastard!! - Kall-Su
 Blade - Augus
 Bleach - Daiji Hirasago (The Bull of Kusajishi), Additional Voices
 Bobobo-bo Bo-bobo - King Nosehair, Additional voices
 Crayon Shin-chan (Phuuz dub) - Bo
 Cyborg 009 - Jean-Paul, Apollo
 Digimon - Pixiemon (Adventure), Guardromon (Tamers), Arbormon (Frontier)
 Eagle Riders - Hunter Harris
 Flint the Time Detective - Dr. Bernard Goodman, Thud of the Cardians, Raldo
 Gatchaman (1994) - Joe
 Ghost in the Shell: Stand Alone Complex - Additional Voices
 Initial D - Kyoichi Sudo (Tokyopop dub)
 Haré+Guu - Gupta
 Heat Guy J - Boma
 Kekkaishi - Hekian, Sanan
 Kikaider - Gill's Assistant
 Kyo Kara Maoh! - Geigen Huber
 Lily C.A.T. - Walt
 Lupin the Third - Additional Voices
 Mirage of Blaze - Takaya Ohgi
 Mobile Suit Gundam (movie trilogy) - Hayato Kobayashi
 Monster - Detective Janáček, Dr. Norden
 Naruto - Izumo Kamizuki, Misumi Tsurugi, Additional voices
 Naruto: Shippuden - Izumo Kamizuki, Sadai (Ep. 196)
 Nightwalker: The Midnight Detective - Tatsuhiko Shido
 Noein - Kuina
 Overman King Gainer - Zakki Bronco
 Paranoia Agent - Oda (Ep. 10)
 Pilot Candidate - Azuma Hijikata
 Rurouni Kenshin - Kenshin Himura
 Saint Tail - Detective Asuka
 Saiyuki Gunlock - Zakuro
 Scryed - Emergy Maxfell
 Space Pirate Captain Herlock: The Endless Odyssey - Tadashi Daiba
 Stellvia - Pierre Takida
 Street Fighter II: The Animated Movie - Vega 
 Street Fighter II V - Vega (Animaze Dub)
 Street Fighter Alpha Generations - Ryu
 Tenchi Muyo! - Seiryo Tennan (OVA 2, Toonami Version)
 Tenchi in Tokyo - Tsugaru
 Tenchi Muyo in Love 2 -  Yosho
 Tenjho Tenge -  Kagesada Sugano
 The Prince of Tennis -  Takashi Kawamura
 The Twelve Kingdoms - Aozaru
 The Cockpit - Lt. Rheindars
 Trigun - Legato Bluesummers
 Tweeny Witches - Sigma
 Vampire Princess Miyu - Koichi (ep.3)
 Witch Hunter Robin - Yutaka Kobari
 WXIII: Patlabor the Movie 3 - Asuma Shinohara
 X - Daisuke Saiki
 Zatch Bell! - Lance

Live action voiceovers
 Bleach - Renji Abarai
 Cromartie High - The Movie - Takashi Kamiyama
 Mighty Morphin Power Rangers - King Sphinx, Eye Guy, Weaveworm, Cardiatron, Jellyfish Warrior (uncredited)
 The Neighbor No. 13 - God of Death
 Power Rangers: Turbo - Clockster (uncredited)
 Power Rangers: In Space - Behemoth (uncredited)
 Power Rangers: Lost Galaxy - Kegler
 Power Rangers: Lightspeed Rescue - Cobra Monster
 Power Rangers: Time Force - Ironspike
 Power Rangers: Wild Force - Jindrax (first 4 episodes)
 Onmyoji - Fujiwara no Morosuke

Movie roles
 Bleach: Fade to Black - Shizuku
 Dawn of the Dead - ADR group
 Digimon: Battle of Adventurers - Labramon
 Do or Die - Herbert
 Fit to Kill - Kenevil
 Ghost in the Shell 2: Innocence - Wakabayashi
 Hard Hunted - Coyote
 Sakura Wars: The Movie - Patrick Hamilton

Video game roles
 Assassin's Creed - Majd Addin, Peasant
 Dishonored 2 - Aramis Stilton
 Fallout 4 - Ricky Dalton, Solomon, Lorenzo Cabot
 Naruto: Ultimate Ninja - Jiraiya, Izumo Kamizuki, Zaku Abumi
 Red Dead Redemption 2 - The Local Pedestrian Population
 Resident Evil: The Darkside Chronicles - Alfred Ashford
 Shadow Hearts: Covenant - Kurando, Blanca, Lenny
 Silent Bomber - Benoit Manderubrot (as Richard Hayworth)
 The Bard's Tale - Additional voices
 The Bouncer - Dauragon C. Mikado (as Richard Hayworth)

References

External links

1953 births
Living people
American male video game actors
American male voice actors
American people of Spanish descent
Male actors from Los Angeles
20th-century American male actors
21st-century American male actors